Pranadaata is a 1992 Telugu-language drama film, produced by P. Balaram under the Sri Anupama Productions banner and directed by Mohan Gandhi. It stars Akkineni Nageswara Rao, Lakshmi, Harish, Charmmila with music composed by Raj–Koti.

Plot
The film begins with Dr. Chakravarthy (Akkineni Nageswara Rao) one of the foremost surgeons in India. He loves & marries a wise lady Kamala (Lakshmi) without acceptance of his elders. So,  she faces severe hardships from her mother-in-law & sister-in-law but Chakravarthy leads an elated life with Kamala & their lovely daughter Jyothi. Suddenly, one day Kamala disappears along with Jyothi when Chakrakarthy's family affirms her as eloped. Distressed Chakravarthy meets with an accident and loses his memory. Years roll by, Chakravarthy becomes a wanderer and reaches a village where he spots its head Bapaiah's (Pundarikakshaiah) son Seenu (Master Seenu) has been paralyzed. Soon, Chakravarthy regains his surgical knowledge and makes the boy normal through an operation in a rude way. After that, Bapaiah establishes a hospital in the village and makes Chakravarthy service the poor which envious local doctor Govindaraju (Kota Srinivasa Rao). The wheel fortune brings Kamala & Jyothi (Charmmila) nearer to Chakravarthy but he is unable to recognize them. Parallelly, a love story runs, Jyothi loves her classmate Narendra (Harish) and Kamala moves to his elders with the marriage proposal. At that juncture, surprisingly, it is revealed that Narendra is Chakravarthy's nephew and his elders denounce Kamala as a slut. Jyothi too believes it and decides to leave the house in that bedlam Kamala meets with an accident. Thereupon, she narrates the past, once Chakravarthy embarks to operate a politician to make him bar the opposition leader abducts Kamala. Irrespective of it, Chakravarthy attains his duty when the enranged opposition leader molests Kamala, wherefore, she discarded. At present, Kamala is terminally ill, Jyothi seeks for Chakrakarthy's help and she departs after watching her husband. Here, Chakravarthy himself performs the funeral without knowing her identity. Thereafter, he promises to couple up Narendra & Jyothi. During, Nani (Paruchri Ravi) a person aspires to possess Jyothi attacks Narendra. In that quarrel, Nani is injured and Chakravarthy treats him. Exploiting it, begrudged Govindraju kills Nani when Chakravarthy is arrested and prosecuted. Right now, the court refers the case to the medical board when Dr. Siva Prasad (Girish Karnad) the disciple of Chakravarthy recognizes and retrieves the memory of his mentor. Besides, Narendra proves the innocence of Chakravarthy and sentences Govindaraju. Finally, the movie ends on a happy note with the marriage Narendra & Jyothi.

Cast

Akkineni Nageswara Rao as Dr. Chakravarthy 
Lakshmi as Kamala 
Harish as Narendra
Charmmila as Jyothi
Girish Karnad as Dr. Siva Prasad
Allu Ramalingaiah as Aadiseshaiah
Kota Srinivasa Rao as Dr. Govindaraju
Brahmanandam as Babu Rao
Babu Mohan as Kondaiah
Pundarikakshaiah as Bapaiah
Mouli as Special appearance
Narra Venkateswara Rao as Jooginadham
Bhimeswara Rao as Inspector
Paruchuri Ravi as Naani
Jenny as Shankaraiah 
Annapurna as Annapurna
Jayalalita as Kalpataruvu
Bangalore Padma as Dr. Bindu
Chandrika as Babu Rao's wife 
Tatineni Rajeswari as Rajeswari 
Raghavamma as Aadiseshaiah's wife 
Master Rajesh as Seenu

Soundtrack

Music composed by Raj–Koti. Music released on Balaji Audio Company.

References

Indian drama films
Films scored by Raj–Koti
Films directed by A. Mohan Gandhi